Martin's Brook  is a community in the Canadian province of Nova Scotia, located along NS Highway # 3 East of the UNESCO World Heritage Town of Lunenburg, Nova Scotia in the Municipality of the District of Lunenburg in Lunenburg County. It is a popular boating and cottage destination and is home to the Krispy Kraut Sauerkraut plant and the Old Black Forest Restaurant along with a number of Bed and Breakfast and cottage rental operations.

References

Communities in Lunenburg County, Nova Scotia
General Service Areas in Nova Scotia